"The Vacation Goo" is the first episode of the fourth season of the animated series American Dad!, an episode produced for Season 2. It originally aired on September 30, 2007. This episode centers around the Smiths, whom start to develop communication issues with each other. Francine becomes aggravated that the family cannot congregate with each other during dinner. Stan later plans for a vacation in Hawaii, only to be interrupted by Roger. The family subsequently go on several virtual vacations, only to have Francine go into an emotional breakdown. The Smith family go onto a cruise, but Francine's suspicions get the best of her and the Smiths are stranded on an island.

This episode was directed by Albert Calleros, and written by Josh Bycel and Jonathan Fener. It received mixed reviews from most television critics. According to the Nielson ratings, it was viewed by 6.03 million households during its original airing, and acquired a 3.1 rating in the 18-49 demographic. Elizabeth Banks guest stars as Becky Arangino in the episode.

Plot
When Francine becomes frustrated that the family is falling apart, trying and failing to get them together for Sunday night dinner, Stan suggests a vacation, and the Smiths have a great time in Maui until Roger somehow awakens them. Francine, Steve and Hayley find themselves floating in virtual reality chambers filled with a green, gooey substance. They learn that Stan programs a vacation in the goo chambers every year because to him, a real vacation is time away from the family. Francine gets angry and demands they go on a real vacation. Twice they appear to do so, first skiing and then going to Italy, but each time they wake up in the goo chambers, with Steve and then Hayley deprogramming the antivacations, both also wanting some time away from each other. Fed up with the family's fracture, Francine breaks down and gives up. Filled with guilt decide to book a cruise to which she declines, until Stan shows her he is returning the chambers to the CIA, convincing her their vacation is real. On the cruise, only Francine has fun until Steve meets Becky (Elizabeth Banks), the attractive cruise activities director, who hits on him (because she is attracted to younger boys).

Meanwhile, Roger, who wants to become a famous movie star, lands a part, only to quit when he is unable to cry on cue and expresses his disgust with the script (which is covered in snot). He then becomes a Myra Hindley impersonator on a cruise ship—the same ship that the Smiths are on. When Francine sees Stan and Hayley acting happy, Steve and Becky together, and Roger singing "Xanadu," she angrily believes to be in the goo chambers again and jumps overboard, expecting to wake up at home. The others, plus Becky, follow her into the sea and rescue her, but realize nobody told the ship to come back for them. They land on an island, where then learn that hunters living on the island plan to hunt them down for sport, causing them to take refuge in a cave.

The ship stops in Cuba, where Roger is forced off the ship for stealing silverware. With no money to return home, he resorts to becoming an exotic dancer at a nearby strip club, but his job nearly becomes prostitution. Distraught by what he's doing and missing his home and family, Roger breaks into tears, to which a heartfelt john gives him money and helps him escape the club. Having finally cried "on cue," Roger believes he can be a star again.

In the cave, Becky is crushed to death when she tries to collect rainwater, and the Smiths reluctantly resort to eating her to survive. The hunters then find them, and the family learns that the island—and the hunt—was part of the cruise. When partially asked about Becky, Francine says "Well, nothing bonds a family like a dark, horrible secret." Stan quickly asks where the family wants to go next year.

The scene then changes to the Smiths happily floating in a hot-air balloon over a vast canyon holding a toast "to the goo," having decided to use the goo chambers, this time together as a family.

Reception
"The Vacation Goo" aired on September 30, 2007 as part of the animated television line-up on Fox. It was preceded by The Simpsons, King of the Hill, and its opposite show Family Guy. It was watched by 6.03 million, according to the Nielson ratings, and garnered a 3.1 rating in the 18-49 demographics. This episode was down 32% in total viewership compared to "Camp Refoogee", the previous season premiere of American Dad which was viewed by 8.9 million homes during its original airing.

"The Vacation Goo" was met with mixed reviews from television critics. In a simultaneous review of the episodes of The Simpsons, King of the Hill, and Family Guy that preceded the show, Genevieve Koski of The A.V. Club gave it a mixed review, writing, "What surprises me more than the show's continued existence, though, is the fact that it's actually pretty funny, which makes the fact that it remains so unremarkable so, well, remarkable. While I usually find the bajillion-megawatt "political satire" of the show to be pretty tiring, the family-oriented storylines can be pretty fun, in a campy way." She went on to criticize the subplot, calling it "weird". She gave the episode a B, the third highest grade of the night, beating out King of the Hill episode "Bobby Rae", but scoring lower than The Simpsons episode "Homer of Seville" and Family Guy episode "Movin' Out (Brian's Song)".

See also
Brain in a vat

References

External links

2007 American television episodes
American Dad! (season 4) episodes
Television episodes about cannibalism
Television episodes about vacationing